Williametta Spencer (born August 15, 1927) is a composer, musicologist, and teacher who plays harpsichord, organ, and piano. She is best known for her award-winning choral work At the Round Earth’s Imagined Corners.

Life and career
Spencer was born in Marion, Illinois, to Viva Jewell and Samuel Joseph Spencer. The family moved to Paducah, Kentucky, where her father was a minister of music at several different Baptist churches during her childhood. Spencer earned a B.A. at Whittier College and a M.Mus. and Ph.D. at the University of Southern California. Her dissertation was entitled The Influence and Stylistic Heritage of André Caplet. In 1953, she received a Fulbright scholarship to study in Paris. Her teachers included Pauline Alderman, Tony Aubin, Alfred Cortot, Ingolf Dahl, Ernst Kanitz, and Halsey Stevens.

Spencer has won several awards, including the Southern California Vocal Association National Composition Award for At the Round Earth’s Imagined Corners; Alumni Achievement Awards from Whittier College in 1995 and 2008; and the Amy Beach Award for her orchestral overture. I Cantori commissioned and premiered her choral work, And the White Rose is a Dove. She is a member of Mu Phi Epsilon and the International Alliance for Women in Music.

Spencer’s works have been published by Associated Music Publishers Inc., Mark Foster Music Co., Orpheus Publications, Shawnee Press, and Western International Music Co. Her publications include:

Article 

The Relationship Between André Caplet and Claude Debussy (The Musical Quarterly, Volume LXVI, Issue 1, January 1980, Pages 112–131)

Chamber 

Adagio and Rondo (oboe and piano)
Sonatina for Clarinet and Piano
Sonata for Trombone and Piano
String Quartet
Suite (flute and piano)
Trio for Brass Instruments

Orchestra 

Overture
Passacaglia and Double Fugue (string orchestra)

Organ 

Improvisation and Meditation on “Gott sei gelobet”

Vocal 

And the White Rose is a Dove (choir)
As I Rode Out This Enders NIght (a cappella choir)
As I Sat Under a Sycamore Tree (a cappella choir)
At the Round Earth’s Imagined Corners (choir; text by John Donne)
Bright Cap and Streamers (choir)
Cantate Domino
Four Madrigals (text by James Joyce)
“Give Me the Splendid Silent Sun” (text by Walt Whitman)
Make We Joy: A Cantata for Christmastide in a Medieval Atmosphere
Missa Brevis
Nova, Nova, Ave Fit Ex Eva (a cappella choir)
Three Songs (text by William Shakespeare; flute, oboe, 2 clarinets, bassoon, and voice)
Two Christmas Madrigals (a cappella choir)
Winter Has Lasted Too Long (voice, clarinet, and piano)

External links 

 
Williametta Spencer

References 

American women classical composers
American classical composers
Living people
1927 births
String quartet composers
University of Southern California alumni
American women musicologists
20th-century American composers
20th-century American women musicians
20th-century American musicologists
21st-century American composers
21st-century American women musicians
21st-century American musicologists
People from Marion, Illinois
Classical musicians from Illinois
People from Paducah, Kentucky
Classical musicians from Kentucky
20th-century classical composers
21st-century classical composers
Fulbright alumni